Rolf Moebius (27 July 1915 – 4 June 2004) was a German actor. He starred in the 1939 film Shoulder Arms.

Partial filmography

 The Dreamer (1936) - Minor Role
 Fanny Elssler (1937) - Duke of Reichstadt
 Urlaub auf Ehrenwort (1938) - Leutnant Walter Prätorius
 Triad (1938) - Ulrich von Möller - sein Sohn
 Play in the Summer Breezes (1939) - Percy Averhoff
 The Curtain Falls (1939) - Hans Günther
 Shoulder Arms (1939) - Paul Hartwig
 We Danced Around the World (1939) - Herbert
 The Years Pass (1945) - Peter Behrendsen, Sohn von Irene und Georg
 Wir sehn uns wieder (1945) - Jochen Gröner - Oberleutnant
 Verspieltes Leben (1949) - Leutnant Dieter Lorenzen
 The Lie (1950)
 Begierde (1951) - Paul - ein Maler
 Das ewige Spiel (1951)
 Das späte Mädchen (1951) - Brüggemann
 Herz der Welt (1952)
 Straße zur Heimat (1952) - Walter Neuhauser
 Tödliche Liebe (1953) - Polizeireporter
 Grandstand for General Staff (1953) - Herzog Karl Eberhard
 The Plot to Assassinate Hitler (1955) - Ordonnanzoffizier
 Der Hauptmann und sein Held (1955)
 Ein Polterabend (1955) - Adolf 'Brennglas' Glasbrenner
 Besondere Kennzeichen: keine (1956) - Werner Schneider
 Treffpunkt Aimée (1956) - Dr. Markus
 Les Misérables (1958) - L'avocat général
 U 47 – Kapitänleutnant Prien (1958) - Stabschef
 Das verbotene Paradies (1958) - Amtsrichter
 Aus dem Tagebuch eines Frauenarztes (1959) - Georg Callway
 The Black Chapel (1959) - Adjutant
 The 1,000 Eyes of Dr. Mabuse (1960) - Police-Officer
 Heidi (1965) - Dr. Rudolf Classen
  (1969) - 2. Herr im Ministerium
 Heintje – Einmal wird die Sonne wieder scheinen (1970) - Bankangestellter
 Die neuen Leiden des jungen W. (1976)

References

Bibliography 
 Richards, Jeffrey. Visions of Yesterday. Routledge & Kegan Paul, 1973.

External links 
 

1915 births
2004 deaths
German male film actors
People from Riesa